The Great Leap; Until Death Do Us Part is a 1914 silent American drama film, directed by Christy Cabanne. It stars Mae Marsh, Robert Harron, and Ralph Lewis, and was released on March 26, 1914.

Cast list
 Mae Marsh as Mary Gibbs
 Robert Harron as Bobby Dawson
 Ralph Lewis
 Eagle Eye
 Donald Crisp
 Raoul Walsh

Production
The film opened on March 26, 1914 at Woodley's Theater in Los Angeles, California. In addition to Christy Cabanne and D. W. Griffith, the premiere was also attended by Mae Marsh, Robert Harron, Ralph Lewis, Donald Crisp, and Raoul Walsh.

References

External links

American silent feature films
American black-and-white films
Silent American drama films
1914 drama films
1914 films
1910s English-language films
1910s American films
Silent romantic drama films